USS Unimak (AVP-31) was a United States Navy Barnegat-class small seaplane tender in commission from 1943 to 1946 that saw service in World War II. After the war, she was in commission in the United States Coast Guard as the cutter USCGC Unimak (WAVP-379), later WHEC-379, WTR-379, and again WHEC-379, from 1949 to 1975 and from 1977 to 1988.

Construction and commissioning

Construction began on Unimak on 15 February 1942 at Harbor Island, Seattle by Associated Shipbuilders, Inc. She was launched on 27 May 1942, sponsored by Mrs. H. B. Berry, the wife of Captain H. B. Berry, the personnel officer of the 13th Naval District, and commissioned on 31 December 1943.

United States Navy service

World War II

Operations in Central America, the Galápagos Islands, and the Caribbean

Unimak was tested into late January 1944. When tests were completed, she departed San Diego on 20 March 1944, bound for the Panama Canal Zone. Arriving at Balboa, Panama, on 28 March 1944, Unimak operated on the Pacific coast of Central America into April 1944, providing logistics support to advanced seaplane bases at Santa Elena Bay, Ecuador, and at Aeolian Bay, Baltra Island, in the Galápagos Islands. She soon shifted to Coco Solo on the Caribbean side of the Panama Canal and transported men and materiel to Barranquilla, Colombia, arriving there on 25 April 1944.

After escorting the merchant ship SS Genevieve Lykes back to Coco Solo on 23 and 24 June 1944, Unimak conducted routine exercises with patrol planes into July 1944. On 4 July 1944 she received reports that a tanker near her position had been torpedoed, and headed for the damaged ship. When she arrived on the scene late that day, Unimak found the tanker still underway, making for the Panama coast. She immediately commenced screening the disabled ship and, aided by an escort of United States Army Air Forces and U.S. Navy planes, shepherded the tanker safely to Colón, Panama, late on the afternoon of 5 July 1944.

Soon thereafter, Unimak shaped her course towards the last reported position of the U.S. Navy K-class blimp K-53. At 15:32 hours on 9 July 1944, she sighted two yellow rubber life rafts and the wreckage of the crashed blimp floating on the water. At 15:58 hours, Unimak took on board nine survivors and sank the unsalvageable blimp by collapsing the bag with 40-millimeter gunfire. She then landed the survivors at Portland Bight, Jamaica.

On 13 July 1944, Unimak joined with the destroyer  in hunting for a submarine reported to be lurking nearby. Within a few days, word of a crashed plane sent the two ships speeding for the last reported position of the aircraft. When they arrived at the crash site, they found widespread debris and small floating pieces of the crashed plane. It was noted in the ship's diary that they recovered a "mutilated unidentifiable crewmember's body" that was "badly blasted and burned".

Unimak remained in the Caribbean through the autumn of 1944, tending patrol planes, conducting logistics support missions for advanced seaplane bases, and occasionally towing targets for the patrol planes training in the area. On 15 December 1944, the seaplane tender  relieved Unimak, releasing her to steam north via Norfolk, Virginia to Boston.

Voyages to England

Arriving at Boston at the end of December 1944, Unimak underwent availability at the Boston Navy Yard for the entire month of January 1945. She got underway for England on 14 February 1945, but an engineering casualty forced her to return to Boston for a major propeller shaft alignment which lasted into March.

On 7 April 1945, Unimak got underway for the British Isles and proceeded, via Bahia Praia in the Azores, to Bristol, England, on the first of two voyages to England to bring back supplies and men from decommissioned U.S. Navy patrol plane squadrons in the United Kingdom, and was engaged in these activities when WWII ended in May 1945. On the second voyage, from 5 June 1945 to 15 June 1945, Unimak transported the men and material of Patrol Bomber Squadron 103 (VPB-103 and 105) from Bristol to Norfolk.

Transfer to the Pacific

Departing Hampton Roads, Virginia, on 20 July 1945, bound for the United States West Coast, Unimak transited the Panama Canal on 26 July 1945 and arrived at San Diego on 3 August 1945. She got underway for Pearl Harbor, Hawaii on 12 August 1945. She was en route when hostilities with Japan ended on 15 August 1945 bringing World War II to a close.

Post-World War II

Unimak operated in the Hawaiian Islands until 7 September 1945, when she headed for the Aleutian Islands. She operated in the northern Pacific Ocean – calling in the Territory of Alaska at Adak and Attu in the Aleutians and at Kodiak on Kodiak Island, and once at Petropavlovsk-Kamchatsky in the Soviet Union – into November 1945 before heading southward to prepare for inactivation.

Reporting for inactivation in December 1945, Unimak was decommissioned on 26 July 1946 and placed in reserve.

United States Coast Guard service
Barnegat-class ships were very reliable and seaworthy and had good habitability. The Coast Guard viewed them as ideal for ocean station duty, in which they would perform weather reporting and search and rescue tasks. They were modified by having a balloon shelter, oceanographic equipment, an oceanographic winch, and a hydrographic winch installed. After World War II, the U.S. Navy transferred 18 of the ships to the Coast Guard, in which they were known as the Casco-class cutters.

The Navy loaned Unimak to the United States Coast Guard on 14 September 1948. After undergoing conversion for Coast Guard use, she was commissioned into the Coast Guard on 3 January 1949 as USCGC Unimak (WAVP-379).

Service history

1949–1975
Unimak was home-ported in Boston, Massachusetts, from 3 January 1949 to 1 September 1956. Her primary duty during her Coast Guard service was to serve on ocean stations to gather meteorological data. While on duty in one of these stations, she was required to patrol a 210-square-mile (544-square-kilometer) area for three weeks at a time, leaving the area only when physically relieved by another Coast Guard cutter or in the case of a dire emergency. While on station, she acted as an aircraft check point at the point of no return, a relay point for messages from ships and aircraft, as a source of the latest weather information for passing aircraft, as a floating oceanographic laboratory, and as a search-and-rescue ship for downed aircraft and vessels in distress. She also engaged in law enforcement operations.

In June 1956, Unimak patrolled the Newport, Rhode Island-to-Bermuda race.

Unimak was stationed at Cape May, New Jersey, from 1 September 1956 to 7 August 1972 and used primarily for training United States Coast Guard Reserve personnel, including training cruises to Brazil and Nova Scotia. She took part in the United States Coast Guard Academy cadet cruise of August 1965.

Unimak was reclassified as a high endurance cutter and redesignated WHEC-379 on 1 May 1966. Her loan period from the Navy came to an end on 26 September 1966, when she was transferred permanently from the Navy to the Coast Guard.

On 7 March 1967, Unimak rescued six Cuban refugees in the Yucatán Channel. On 10 March 1967 she rescued survivors from the fishing vessel Bunkie III in Florida waters. On 15 March 1967, she rescued 12 Cuban refugees who were stranded on an island.

Unimak was reclassified as a training ship and again redesignated, this time as WTR-379, on 28 November 1969. On 3 April 1970, she stood by the grounded merchant ship Vassiliki near Mayaguana Island until a commercial tugboat arrived to assist Vassiliki.

From 7 August 1972 to 31 May 1975, Unimak was stationed at Yorktown, Virginia, and was again used to train Coast Guard reservists.

The Coast Guard decommissioned Unimak on 31 May 1975 and placed her in reserve at the Coast Guard Yard at Curtis Bay, Maryland.

1977–1988
On 22 August 1977, the Coast Guard recommissioned Unimak, reclassifying her as a high-endurance cutter and returning her to the designation WHEC-379. She was home-ported at New Bedford, Massachusetts, for the rest of her Coast Guard career. During this stint in commission, she was used primarily for fisheries patrol.

Unimak also interdicted the trafficking of illegal drugs. On 14 October 1980, she seized the pleasure craft Rescue, which was carrying approximately 500 bales of marijuana, and the pleasure craft Snail, with two tons of marijuana on board, in the Gulf of Mexico. On 17 October 1980, she seized the merchant vessel Amalaka southwest of Key West, Florida; Amalaka was carrying 1,000 bales of marijuana. On 19 October 1980, she seized the fishing vessel Wrights Pride southwest of Key West; the ship had 30 tons of marijuana aboard. In March 1981, while on an Officer Candidate School training cruise, she intercepted the merchant ship Mayo with 40 tons of marijuana on board.

Between 28 January 1983 and 9 March 1983, Unimak again deployed to the Caribbean for a law-enforcement patrol. On 27 and 28 February 1983, she towed the dismasted sailing vessel Wandering Star to Matthew Town on Great Inagua in the Bahamas. On 3 March 1983, she towed the disabled merchant vessel Yadrina to Matthew Town.

Decommissioning and disposal
Unimak was the last of the 35 Barnegat-class ships and the last of the 18 Casco-class cutters in service in the United States when the Coast Guard decommissioned her on 29 April 1988 and transferred her to the U.S. Navy. She was then sunk that year as an artificial reef off the Virginia coast in 150 feet (46 meters) of water.

Awards
 American Campaign Medal
 European-African-Middle Eastern Campaign Medal
 Asiatic-Pacific Campaign Medal
 World War II Victory Medal
 National Defense Service Medal with star

Notes

References 

 
 
 Department of the Navy: Naval Historical Center: Online Library of Selected Images: U.S. Navy Ships: USS Unimak (AVP-31), 1943-1948
 navsource.org NavSource Online: Service Ship Photo Archive: USCGC Unimak (WHEC-379) ex USCGC Unimak (WTR-379) (1969 - 1977) USCGC Unimak (WHEC-379) (1966 - 1969) USCGC Unimak (WAVP-379) (1948 - 1966) USS Unimak (AVP-31) (1943 - 1948)
 United States Coast Guard Historians Office: USCGC Unimak, 1948 WHEC-379
 United States Coast Guard Historian's Office: Mackinac, 1949 WHEC-371
 Chesneau, Roger. Conways All the World's Fighting Ships 1922–1946. New York: Mayflower Books, Inc., 1980. .
 Gardiner, Robert. Conway's All the Worlds Fighting Ships 1947–1982, Part I: The Western Powers. Annapolis, Maryland: Naval Institute Press, 1983. .

External links

 

World War II auxiliary ships of the United States
Ships transferred from the United States Navy to the United States Coast Guard
Seaplane tenders of the United States Navy
Barnegat-class seaplane tenders
Shipwrecks of the Virginia coast
1942 ships
Ships sunk as artificial reefs
Maritime incidents in 1988
Ships of the United States Coast Guard
Casco-class cutters
Alaska-related ships
Weather ships